Centerville City School District is the school district serving Centerville and Washington Township, Ohio, United States.

Schools
Centerville City School District has eight elementary schools, three middle schools and one high school.

Secondary schools

Magsig Middle School
Tower Heights Middle School
Watts Middle School
Centerville High School

Primary schools

Cline Elementary
Driscoll Elementary
John Hole Elementary
Normandy Elementary
Primary Village North
Primary Village South
Stingley Elementary
Weller Elementary

See also
List of school districts in Ohio

References

External links

Education in Montgomery County, Ohio
School districts in Ohio